Pontiac Lake State Recreation Area is located in White Lake Township, Oakland County, Michigan, just west of Waterford, Michigan.

Facilities
 Campground - 176 Sites, 24 Equestrian sites
 Beach House
 Boat Launch
 Picnic Area
 Picnic Shelter - Reservation required
 Playground
 Stable - Horse rental
 Store
 Shooting Range

Activities
 Cross Country Skiing - 
 Fishing
 Hiking - 
 Horseback Riding - 
 Hunting
 Metal Detecting
 Mountain Biking - 
 Snow-mobiling
 Swimming

References

External links
Pontiac Lake Recreation Area Michigan Department of Natural Resources
Pontiac Lake Recreation Area Protected Planet (World Database on Protected Areas)

State recreation areas of Michigan
Protected areas of Oakland County, Michigan
Huron River (Michigan)